This is a list of Commercial banks and savings banks located in Denmark. This list is based upon information from the Finanstilsynet, the financial regulatory authority of the Danish government responsible for the regulation of financial markets in Denmark.

Banks in Denmark
Finanstilsynet divides banks in size groups based on their working capital, with two additional groups for banks not based in Denmark.

Group 1
Working capital DKK 75 billion or more.
Danske Bank A/S
Jyske Bank A/S
Nordea Bank Danmark A/S
Nykredit Bank A/S
Sydbank A/S

Group 2
Working capital DKK 12 billion or more.
 Alm. Brand Bank A/S
 Arbejdernes Landsbank, Aktieselskab
 FIH Erhvervsbank A/S
 Jutlander Bank A/S
 Sparekassen Kronjylland
 Lån & Spar Bank A/S
 Ringkøbing Landbobank, Aktieselskab
 Saxo Bank A/S
 Sparekassen Sjælland
 Spar Nord Bank A/S
 Sparekassen Vendsyssel
 Vestjysk Bank A/S

Group 3
Working capital DKK 500 million or more.

 Basisbank A/S
 BRFkredit Bank A/S
 Broager Sparekasse
 Coop Bank A/S
 Danske Andelskassers Bank A/S
 Djurslands Bank A/S
 Dragsholm Sparekasse
 Dronninglund Sparekasse
 Ekspres Bank A/S
 Finansbanken A/S
 Folkesparekassen
 Frørup Andelskasse
 Frøs Herreds Sparekasse
 Frøslev-Mollerup Sparekasse
 Fynske Bank A/S
 Grønlandsbanken, Aktieselskab
 Hals Sparekasse
 Hvidbjerg Bank Aktieselskab
 Kreditbanken A/S
 Lægernes Pensionsbank A/S
 Landbrugets Finansieringsbank (LFB)
 Langå Sparekasse
 Lollands Bank, Aktieselskab
 Merkur, Den Almennyttige Andelskasse
 Middelfart Sparekasse
 Møns Bank, A/S
 Nordfyns Bank Aktieselskabet
 Nordjyske Bank A/S
 Nørresundby Bank A/S
 Nr. Nebel og Omegn, Sparekassen for
 Østjydsk Bank A/S
 PenSam Bank A/S
 Rise Sparekasse
 Rønde Sparekasse
 Salling Bank A/S
 Saxo Privatbank A/S
 Skjern Bank, Aktieselskabet
 Sparekassen Balling
 Sparekassen Bredebro
 Sparekassen Djursland
 Sparekassen Faaborg A/S
 Sparekassen Thy
 Totalbanken A/S
 Vorbasse-Hejnsvig Sparekasse

Group 4
Working capital DKK 500 million or less.
 Andelskassen Fælleskassen
 Borbjerg Sparekasse
 Fanø Sparekasse
 Faster Andelskasse
 Fjaltring-Trans Sparekasse
 Flemløse Sparekasse
 Klim Sparekasse
 Leasing Fyn Bank A/S
 PFA Udbetalingsbank
 Refsnæs Sparekasse
 Søby-Skader-Halling Sparekasse
 Sønderhå-Hørsted Sparekasse
 Stadil Sparekasse

Group 5
Branches of foreign banks in Denmark.

 Bank Norwegian Denmark, branch of Bank Norwegian AS, Norway
 BIL Danmark, branch of Banque Internationale à Luxembourg S.A., Luxemburg
 BNP Paribas Fortis Danmark, branch of BNP Paribas Fortis SA/NV Belgium
 Carnegie Investment Bank, branch of Carnegie Investment Bank AB (PUBL),Sweden
 Citibank International Limited
 De Lage Landen Finans Danmark, branch of De Lage Landen Finans AB, Sweden
 Deutsche Bank AG, Copenhagen Branch, branch of Deutsche Bank AG, Germany
 Diners Club Danmark, branch of Diners Club Nordic AB, Sweden
 DNB Bank ASA, branch of DNB Bank ASA, Norway
 Eurocard Danmark, branch of Eurocard AB, Sweden
 FOREX Bank, branch of Forex Bank AB, Sweden
 Forso Danmark, branch of Forso Nordic AB, Sweden
 Handelsbanken Finans. branch of Handelsbanken Finans AB Sweden
 Handelsbanken Kredit, branch of Stadshypotek AB, Sweden
 Handelsbanken, branch of Svenska Handelsbanken AB (publ),Sweden
 Ikano Bank AB (publ), branch of Ikano Bank (publ), Sweden
 J.P. Morgan Europe (UK), Copenhagen Branch, branch of J.P. Morgan Europe Limited, Great Britain
 Nordea, branch of Nordea Bank AB (publ), Sweden
 Nordnet Bank branch of Nordnet Bank AB, Sweden
 Resurs Bank, branch of Resurs Bank Aktiebolag, Sweden
 Santander Consumer Bank DK, branch of Santander Consumer Bank AB, Sweden
 Santander Consumer Bank, branch of Santander Consumer Bank A/S, Norway
 Scania Finans, branch of Scania Finans AB, Sweden
 SEB Kort Bank, Danmark, branch of SEB Kort Bank AB, Sweden
 Siemens Financial Services Danmark, branch of Siemens Financial Services AB, Sweden
 Skandinaviska Enskilda Banken, Danmark, branch of Skandinaviska Enskilda Banken AB(PUBL.),Sweden
 Swedbank, branch of Swedbank AB (publ), Sweden
 TeliaSonera Finans Danmark, branch of TeliaSonera Finans AB, Sweden
 The Royal Bank of Scotland plc, Danish filial, branch of the Royal Bank of Scotland plc, UK
 UBS (Luxembourg) S.A.,Denmark Branch, branch of UBS (Luxembourg) S.A

Group 6
Banks based on the Faroe Islands.
 Eik Banki P/F
 Norðoya Sparikassi
 P/F BankNordik
 P/F Suðuroyar Sparikassi

References

Banks
Banks of Denmark
Denmark
Banks
Denmark